Charles Mackintosh (or Macintosh, McIntosh) may refer to:

Charles Henry Mackintosh (1820–1896), Irish Christian preacher
Charles Herbert Mackintosh (1843–1931), Canadian politician 
Charles Rennie Mackintosh (1868–1928), Scottish architect and artist
Charles Macintosh (1766–1843), Scottish chemist and inventor
Charles Macintosh (composer and naturalist) (1839–1922), Scottish composer and naturalist
Charles Macintosh (rugby union) (1869–1918), New Zealand rugby player and politician 
Charles McIntosh (1892–1970), Saskatchewan politician 
Charles Edward McIntosh (1836–1915), Canadian American politician in Wisconsin